The 2016 AFC Cup Final was the final match of the 2016 AFC Cup, the 13th edition of the AFC Cup, a football competition organized by the Asian Football Confederation (AFC) for clubs from 'developing countries' in Asia according to the Vision Asia plan.

The final was contested as a single match between Iraqi team Al-Quwa Al-Jawiya and Indian team Bengaluru FC. The match was hosted by Al-Quwa Al-Jawiya at the Suheim Bin Hamad Stadium in Doha on 5 November 2016.

Al-Quwa Al-Jawiya defeated Bengaluru FC 1–0 to become the first Iraqi team to win the AFC Cup title.

Venue
As Iraqi teams were not allowed to host their home matches in their country, the final was played at the Suheim Bin Hamad Stadium, also known as Qatar SC Stadium, a multi-purpose stadium in Doha, Qatar. It is the home stadium of Qatar Sports Club and holds 13,000 spectators.

Background
Al-Quwa Al-Jawiya qualified for the 2016 AFC Cup group stage as the 2014–15 Iraqi Premier League runners-up. This was their first appearance in the AFC Cup.

Bengaluru FC qualified for the 2016 AFC Cup as the 2014–15 Indian Federation Cup winners. This was their second consecutive appearance in the AFC Cup.

Both teams reached the AFC Cup final for the first time, and Bengaluru FC were the first team from India to reach the final.

Road to the final

Note: In all results below, the score of the finalist is given first (H: home; A: away).

Rules
The final was played as a single match, with the host team decided by draw. If tied after regulation, extra time and, if necessary, penalty shoot-out would be used to decide the winner.

Match

References

External links
AFC Cup, the-AFC.com

AFC Cup finals
Final
Al-Quwa Al-Jawiya matches
Bengaluru FC matches
International club association football competitions hosted by Qatar